Langara may refer to:

Places

British Columbia, Canada
Langara Island, the northernmost island of Haida Gwaii
Langara Light, lighthouse on Langara Island
Vancouver-Langara, provincial legislative constituency (electoral district) in Vancouver

Norway
Langåra, an island of Tiholmane, part of the Thousand Islands

People
Isidro Lángara (1912—1992), Spanish football striker
Juan de Lángara (1736—1806), Spanish naval officer

Arts
Langara (Stargate), race and planet in the fictional Stargate SG-1 universe

Education
Langara College, a four-year community college in Vancouver, Canada